Uckfield Town Council governs the five wards of Uckfield town. The council appoints one councillor who is then known as the Mayor of Uckfield. The current Mayor of Uckfield is Councillor Jackie Love.''

Uckfield town council comprises five wards – North, East, West, New Town, and Ridgewood – electing between two and four town councillors each.

Clockwise, from the north, it borders the communities of Maresfield, Buxted, Framfield and Little Horsted.

Current composition

Election history
Uckfield town council is composed of up to 15 councillors elected from five wards. The last elections were in 2019, and resulted in the election of 6 councillors for TRUST Independent, 2 for the Liberal Democrats, 2 Conservative councillors, 2 Labour councillors and 1 Independent councillor. 2 seats were left vacant and were filled by co-option at the first Full Council meeting.

2019–2023 by-elections

2019 election
The 2019 Uckfield town council elections were held alongside the elections for Wealden District Council on 2 May 2019 on new ward boundaries. 9 seats were up for election, as only 2 candidates for 3 seats were nominated in Uckfield North ward and 2 candidates for 3 seats in Uckfield Ridgwood ward, with incumbent Councillor Keith Everett having submitted his nomination papers, but passing away before the close of nominations. At the first meeting of the new Town Council, Karen Bedwell was co-opted as a Councillor for Ridgewood ward and Colin Snelgrove co-opted as a Councillor for North ward, filling all 15 seats on the council. Both Councillors Bedwell and Snelgrove subsequently joined the Trust Independent group. Diane Ward, who ran as an Independent councillor, also sits with the Trust Independent group.

2015–2019 by-elections

Change of party affiliation 2016
On the 5 July 2016 it was announced that Cllr Spike Mayhew & Cllr Jacqueline Beckford had resigned from the Liberal Democrats. It was reported that they would now be acting as Independent Councillors.

2015 election
The 2015 Uckfield town council elections were held alongside the elections for Wealden District Council & the Wealden Parliamentary constituency on 7 May 2015. All 15 seats were up for election.

2011–2015 by-elections

2011 election
In the 2011 elections, 7 seats were won by the Conservatives, 5 by the Liberal Democrats and 3 by independents.

2007–2011 by-elections

2007 election
In the 2007 elections, 6 seats were won by Independent candidates, 6 by the Liberal Democrats and 3 by the Conservatives.

2003–2007 by-elections

2003 election
In the 2003 elections, 5 seats were won by the Liberal Democrats, 3 by the Conservatives, 2 by Labour & 2 by Independent candidates. 2 seats were unfilled in Central Ward and 1 seat was unfilled in Ridgewood.

Mayoral history

References

Parish councils of England
Local authorities in East Sussex
Town Council